Michael Joseph O'Dowd (April 5, 1895 in St. Paul, Minnesota – July 28, 1957) was an American boxer who held the World Middleweight Championship from 1917 to 1920.

Biography
O'Dowd won the title on November 14, 1917 by knocking out Al McCoy in the sixth round after dropping him six times. O'Dowd was the only active boxing champion to fight at the front during World War I (1918, while serving in the U.S. Army). During his career he claimed victories over Hall of Famers Jack Britton, Mike Gibbons, Kid Lewis and Jeff Smith. On February 25, 1918, he held the legendary Harry Greb to a draw. O'Dowd was knocked out just once in his career, his last fight on March 16, 1923.  

O'Dowd died on July 28, 1957 from a heart attack at a Veteran's hospital, aged 62. He was inducted into the Minnesota Boxing Hall of Fame in 2011 and the International Boxing Hall of Fame in 2014.

Professional boxing record
All information in this section is derived from BoxRec, unless otherwise stated.

Official record

All newspaper decisions are officially regarded as “no decision” bouts and are not counted in the win/loss/draw column.

Unofficial record

Record with the inclusion of newspaper decisions in the win/loss/draw column.

See also
List of middleweight boxing champions

References

External links

 O'Dowd's Record at Cyber Boxing Zone
 

1895 births
1957 deaths
United States Army personnel of World War I
Middleweight boxers
Boxers from Saint Paul, Minnesota
American male boxers